This is a partial discography of William Tell (French: Guillaume Tell), an opera with music by Gioachino Rossini and a French libretto by Etienne de Jouy and Hippolyte Bis. The work was first performed on 3 August 1829 by the Paris Opera at the Salle Le Peletier. It was first performed in Italian as Guglielmo Tell in Germany on 28–29 January 1831 in Dresden and in Italy on 17 September 1831 in Lucca (translated by Calisto Bassi).

French original as Guillaume Tell

Italian translation as Guglielmo Tell

German translation as Wilhelm Tell

References

Notes

Sources
Loewenberg, Alfred (1978). Annals of Opera 1597–1940 (third edition, revised). Totowa, New Jersey: Rowman and Littlefield. .

Opera discographies